The 1912 VMI Keydets football team represented the Virginia Military Institute (VMI) in their 22nd season of organized football. The Keydets again went 7–1 under head coach Alpha Brummage.

Schedule

References

VMI
VMI Keydets football seasons
VMI Keydets football